Cieza can refer to:

 Pedro Cieza de León, primary source historian of Incan Peru at the time of the Spanish conquest.
 Cieza, Murcia, a municipality of autonomous community of Murcia, Spain
 Cieza, Cantabria, a municipality of autonomous community of Cantabria, Spain